Arturo Alvarez may refer to:

 Arturo Álvarez (basketball), Spanish basketball coach
 Arturo Álvarez (footballer, born 1959), Mexican footballer
 Arturo Álvarez (footballer, born 1985), American-born Salvadoran footballer
 Arturo Álvarez (swimmer) (born 1919), Peruvian swimmer
 Arturo G. Álvarez, music producer, manager, A&R, and artist